Samsul Huda is an All India United Democratic Front politician from Assam. He was elected in Assam Legislative Assembly from Bilasipara East in the 2021 Assam Legislative Assembly election.

References

Assam politicians
Year of birth missing (living people)
Living people
Assam MLAs 2021–2026
All India United Democratic Front politicians